Tebo Regency is a regency of Jambi Province, Indonesia. It is located on the island of Sumatra. The regency has an area of 6,461 km² and had a population of 297,735 at the 2010 Census and 337,669 at the 2020 Census. The regency seat is at the town of Muara Tebo.

Administrative districts
The twelve districts (kecamatan) currently forming the Regency are listed below with their areas and their populations at the 2010 and 2020 Censuses. The table includes the locations of the district administrative centres, and the number of villages (rural desa and urban kelurahan) in each district.

References

Regencies of Jambi